Ashley Joens (born March 16, 2000) is an American college basketball player for the Iowa State Cyclones of the Big 12 Conference. She plays both the small forward and shooting guard positions. Joens had been considered one of the top prospects in the 2022 WNBA draft, but chose not to enter the draft and returned for a fifth season in 2022–23.

High school career 
Joens attended Iowa City High School, where she was a two-sport athlete in basketball and track and field. In basketball, she played on the varsity team all four years and started every single game, eventually becoming the school's all-time leader in points. As a high school senior, she averaged 30.7 points and 11.4 rebounds per game and was also named Miss Iowa Basketball at season's end.

A five-star recruit out of high school, Joens committed to playing college basketball at Iowa State, and was the program's highest rated recruit in history.

College career

Freshman season 
As a highly touted freshman, Joens appeared and started in all 35 games the Cyclones played that season, averaging nearly 12 points per game. She scored double figures in 20 games, and was named to the Big 12's All-Freshman team at the end of the season.

Sophomore season 
In her sophomore season, Joens saw a more expanded role as she led the Big 12 Conference in points per game with 20.5, and also added 10.9 rebounds per game to average a double-double. She scored a career-high 41 points against Wright State on December 11, 2019, tied for second for a single-game scoring record by an Iowa State player.

Junior season 
Joens continued to improve as she broke the Iowa State program's single-season record for points per game with 24.2, training in the barn of a family friend during the COVID-19 pandemic to stay in shape. She scored 36 points  in a loss to South Dakota State, also earning her 19th double-double of the season.

In the opening round of the NCAA tournament, Joens scored 33 points to help lead the Cyclones past Michigan State 79–76. In their next match against Texas A&M, Joens recorded a double-double with 32 points and 18 rebounds in an overtime loss, becoming the 4th player from the Big 12 Conference to record 30+ points and 15+ rebounds in an NCAA tournament game.

In addition to being named to the first-team All-Big 12 Conference team, Joens gained national recognition at the end of the season as she was named the 2021 recipient of the Cheryl Miller Award, given to the best small forward in college basketball, as well as a third-team All-American by the United States Basketball Writers Association (USBWA).

Senior season 
As a senior in 2021–22, Joens became the Cyclones' all-time scoring leader, averaging 20.3 points and 9.5 rebounds while the Cyclones reached the Sweet Sixteen of the NCAA tournament for the first time since 2010. She was a unanimous first-team All-Big 12 selection and repeated as the Cheryl Miller Award recipient. Joens was named to all three major All-America teams, making the Associated Press and USBWA second teams and the 10-member team chosen by the Women's Basketball Coaches Association.

"Super senior" season 
Shortly after the Cyclones' 2022 NCAA tournament run ended, Joens announced that she would forego the WNBA draft and return for a fifth season at Iowa State. Because the 2020–21 basketball season had been extensively disrupted by COVID-19, the NCAA had ruled that said season would not be counted against the athletic eligibility of any basketball player, giving her the option of an extra college season. Joens was named to the six-member AP preseason All-America team on October 25, 2022. She went on to lead the Big 12 in scoring and rank third in rebounding during the conference season, and was named the conference player of the year. During the Big 12 tournament, Joens became the 14th player in NCAA Division I history to score 3,000 career points, and was named the tournament's most outstanding player after leading the Cyclones to the title.

National team career 
Joens was a member of the U-18 team for their appearance in the 2018 FIBA Under-18 Women's Americas Championship, winning a gold medal as the captain of the team despite not being named to the initial roster. She was also a member of the U-19 team that won the gold medal for the FIBA U19 Women's World Cup in Bangkok. 

Joens was invited to participate in the Women's AmeriCup Team Trials in 2021.

Career statistics

College 

|-
| style="text-align:left;" | 2018–19
| style="text-align:left;" | Iowa State
| 35 || 35 || 31.2 || .433 || .365 || .701 || 5.0 || 0.7 || 0.7 || 0.2 || 1.1 || 11.7
|-
| style="text-align:left;" | 2019–20
| style="text-align:left;" | Iowa State
| 29 || 29 || 35.6 || .417 || .336 || .806 || 10.9 || 1.9 || 1.6 || 0.3 || 2.7 || style="background:#D3D3D3"| 20.5°
|-
| style="text-align:left;" | 2020–21
| style="text-align:left;" | Iowa State
| 28 || 28 || 33.6 || .463 || .354 || .883 || 9.5 || 1.6 || 1.0 || 0.5 || 2.5 || style="background:#D3D3D3" | 24.2°
|-
| style="text-align:left;" | 2021–22
| style="text-align:left;" | Iowa State
| 34 || 34 || 35.5 || .409 || .376 || .852 || 9.5 || 2.0 || 0.9 || 0.4 || 2.1 || 20.9
|-
| style="text-align:center;" colspan=2 | Career
| 126 || 126 || 33.9 || .430 || .362 || .829 || 8.6 || 1.5 || 1.0 || 0.4 || 2.0 || 18.8

Personal life 
Joens is the daughter of Brian and Lisa Joens, and has four sisters. Her older sister Courtney played basketball at Illinois while her younger sister Aubrey played basketball alongside her for two seasons at Iowa State before transferring to Oklahoma after the 2021–22 season.

See also 
 List of NCAA Division I women's basketball players with 2,500 points and 1,000 rebounds

Footnotes

References

External links 
 
 
 Iowa State Cyclones profile
 USA Basketball profile

2000 births
Living people
Sportspeople from Cedar Rapids, Iowa
Sportspeople from Iowa City, Iowa
Basketball players from Iowa
Small forwards
Shooting guards
Iowa State Cyclones women's basketball players
All-American college women's basketball players